J. Edward Kline (born July 29, 1947) is an American politician who served in the New Jersey General Assembly from the 2nd Legislative District from 1984 to 1992.

References

1947 births
Living people
Politicians from Atlantic City, New Jersey
Republican Party members of the New Jersey General Assembly